Central Station (Chicago) may refer to:

Historical stations 

 Great Central Station, 1856 to 1893
 Grand Central Station (Chicago), 1890 to 1968
 Central Station (Chicago terminal), 1893 to 1972

Chicago Transit Authority stations 

 Central station (CTA Green Line)
 Central station (CTA Purple Line)
 Central station (CTA Congress Line) (defunct, trackage is part of Blue Line)

Residential 

 Central Station, Chicago, a neighborhood near the former station

Railway stations in Chicago